Trump Institute was a traveling lecture series founded in 2005. The seminar series was owned and operated by Irene and Mike Milin of Boca Raton, Florida. It used Donald Trump's name via a licensing agreement with Trump University. According to the general counsel for The Trump Organization, the licensing agreement expired in 2009 and was not renewed.

During 2006, its first full year of operation, the company put on 120 seminars in 30 cities across the United States, with The Trump Organization receiving a cut for every seat filled. Although the Institute and Trump University were separately owned, their operations overlapped, and they often used promotional materials bearing both names. Many students complained that the Institute made false promises of prosperity and provided little actual teaching, and that requests for refunds were refused or stonewalled. Hundreds of letters of complaint were filed with the state attorneys general of New York, Florida, and Texas and with local Better Business Bureaus.

Although Trump was not personally involved in the operation of the seminar, he endorsed the series in a broadcast infomercial titled The Donald Trump Way to Wealth. In the infomercial, Trump claimed that "I put all of my concepts that have worked so well for me, new and old, into our seminar... I’m teaching what I’ve learned.”

Michael Sexton, Trump's partner in Trump University, said he chose to work with the Milins because they were "the best in the business". But the Milins had a record of previous get-rich-quick schemes and fraud investigations in multiple states dating back to the 1980s.

In 2016 it was revealed that the booklet for Trump Institute, titled Billionaire’s Road Map to Success, included at least 20 pages that were plagiarized verbatim from Success magazine. The plagiarism was discovered by American Bridge 21st Century, a super PAC.

References

Companies based in Boca Raton, Florida
2005 establishments in Florida
2009 disestablishments in Florida
Business career of Donald Trump